The 1990 PGA of Japan Tour was the 18th season of the PGA of Japan Tour. The season consisted of 44 official events, all played in Japan.

Schedule
The following table lists official events during the 1990 season.

Money list
The money list was based on prize money won during the season, calculated in Japanese yen.

Notes

References

External links

Japan Golf Tour
PGA of Japan Tour
PGA of Japan Tour